Cristina Serban Ionda is a New Zealand-based Romanian actor and presenter best known for playing the pathologist Gina Kadinsky in the New Zealand television series The Brokenwood Mysteries since 2014.

Ionda grew up in Brașov in Transylvania, and studied for a BA in acting at the Theater and Cinema Art Institute (1994-98) in Bucharest, going on to complete a postgraduate diploma in Audio-Visual studies. Following her experience as a townswoman on 2003's "Cold Mountain" she and her husband moved to New Zealand, inspired by watching a Discovery Channel documentary.

Film

Television

References

External links

People from Brașov
Romanian actresses
New Zealand actresses
New Zealand television actresses
Living people
21st-century New Zealand actresses
Romanian expatriates in New Zealand